PUGNAc is a 1,5-hydroximolactone, acting as an inhibitor of a variety of N-acetylhexosaminidases. It was long thought that increased levels of O-GlcNAc in human cells lead to Type II diabetes. O-GlcNAc levels were artificially raised with PUGNAc, which inhibits O-GlcNAcase, a beta-exo-N-acetylhexosaminidase which cleaves beta-O-linked-N-acetylglucosamine residues from glycoproteins. As a result of this inhibition, a type II diabetic phenotype was observed.  Recent pharmacological studies using a more selective O-GlcNAcase inhibitor did not see this effect.  However, genetic manipulation of O-GlcNAc levels is consistent with the effects observed by PUGNAc, namely insulin resistance upon elevation of O-GlcNAc levels.

Fictional references
PUGNAc was used by Michael Scofield in the television series Prison Break to keep his blood sugar level high to appear diabetic.

References

External links 
 Research paper

Amino sugars
Carbamates
Hydrolase inhibitors